This list contains people associated with the Selwyn House School in Westmount, Quebec, Canada, including current and former headmasters, as well as notable alumni and faculty.

Notable alumni 
 John Aimers (1951-), founder of the Monarchist League of Canada
 Joel Anthony (1982-), former basketball player and two-time champion
 Eldon Pattyson Black (1925-1999), diplomat
 Charles Bronfman (1931-), businessman
 Edgar Bronfman Sr. (1929-2013), businessman
 Edward Bronfman (1927-2005), businessman
 Peter Bronfman (1929-1996), businessman
 John Caird (1948-), stage director and playwright
 Arthur Grant Campbell (1916-1996), diplomat
 Egan Chambers (1921-1994), politician and Progressive Conservative MP (1958–62) 
 Michel Choquette (1938-), humourist
 James Campbell Clouston (1900-1940), military officer
 David Culver (1924-2017), businessman
 Andre Desmarais (1956-), businessman.
 Olivier Desmarais, businessman
 James de Beaujeu Domville (1933-2015), theatre producer and administrator
 Charles Drury (1912-1991), politician and Liberal MP (1962–78)
 Jonathan Emile (1986-), hip-hop artist
 Angelo Esposito (1989-), hockey player (SG Cortina)
 Greg Fergus (1969-), politician and Liberal MP (2015-)
 Tim Fleiszer (1975-), football player
 Robert Fowler (1944-), diplomat
 John Glassco (1909-1981), writer
 Michael Goldbloom (1953-), lawyer, publisher and academic administrator
 Richard Goldbloom (1924-2021), pediatrician and university professor
 Victor Goldbloom (1923-2016), pediatrician and Liberal politician
 Vincenzo Guzzo (1969-), businessman
 Conrad Harrington (1912-2000), lawyer and Chancellor of McGill University (1976–83)
 Richard Iton (1961-2013), professor
 Jonathan Kay (1968-), journalist
 Stephen Leopold (1951-), real estate entrepreneur
 Tiff Macklem (1961-), banker and current Governor of the Bank of Canada
 George Carlyle Marler (1901-1981), politician and Liberal MP (1954–58)
 John McCallum (1950-), economist, Liberal MP (2000-2017) and former Canadian ambassador to China (2017-2019)
 Michael Meighen (1939-), lawyer, Progressive Conservative senator (1990-2012) and current Chancellor of McGill University
 John Campbell Merrett (1909-1998), architect
 Torrey Mitchell (1985-), hockey player (Montreal Canadiens)
 Eric Molson (1937-), businessman
 Geoff Molson (1971-), businessman
 Hartland Molson (1907-2002), brewer and senator (1955-1993)
 Mark Molson (1949-2006), bridge player
 Robert Moncel (1917-2007), military general
 Mark Pathy (1969-), businessman and private astronaut
 Michael D. Penner (1969-), lawyer and businessman
 Timothy Porteous (1933-2020), administrator
 Jacob Richler, journalist and restaurant critic
 Jeff Russel (1900-1926), football player
 Hazen Sise (1906-1974), architect
 Devon Soltendieck (1985-), television news reporter
 Tiga Sontag (1974-), electronic music producer
 John Kennett Starnes (1918-2014), diplomat
 Donald Steven (1945-), composer
 Charles Taylor (1931-), philosopher
 Ralph C. S. Walker (1944-), philosopher

Notable faculty
 Patrick Anderson (1915-1979), poet
 Edward O. Phillips (1931-2020), author
 Alexis S. Troubetzkoy (1934-2017), author and former headmaster

References

Alumni by secondary school in Canada
High schools in Montreal